A hanging tree is any tree used to perform executions by hanging.

Hanging tree or The Hanging Tree may also refer to:

Gallows, a frame for carrying out execution by hanging

Music
The Hanging Tree (band), an Australian stoner rock band of the mid to late 1990s

Songs
"Hanging Tree" (Counting Crows song)
"The Hanging Tree" (Marty Robbins song) (1959)
"The Hanging Tree" (The Hunger Games song) (2014)
"The Hanging Tree", a 1998 song by Arena from The Visitor
"Hanging Tree", a 2001 song by Blackmore's Night from Fires at Midnight
"Hanging Tree", a 2001 song by The Desert Sessions from Volumes 7 & 8
"Hanging Tree", a 2002 cover by Queens of the Stone Age from Songs for the Deaf
"Hangin' Tree", a 1988 song by Green River from Sub Pop 200
"Hanging Tree", a 1990 song by Bob Mould from Black Sheets of Rain
"Hanging Tree", a 1977 song by Uriah Heep from Firefly

Other uses
Hanging tree (United States), any tree used to perform executions by hanging
The Hanging Tree (Aaronovitch novel), a 2016 novel by Ben Aaronovitch
The Hanging Tree (Johnson novel), a 1957 novel by Dorothy M. Johnson
The Hanging Tree (film), a 1959 movie directed by Delmer Daves, based on the novel by Dorothy Johnson